Elana Greenfield  (born New York City) is an American playwright, and short story writer.

Life
Greenfield was raised in Israel. 
She graduated from Sarah Lawrence College, and from Brown University with an MFA.
She was Artistic Director of New Dramatists.  Currently, she teaches dramatic writing at The New School, in the Eugene Lang College division.  She formerly taught the same subject at New York University.

Her work has appeared in Bomb and The Brooklyn Rail.

Awards
 2004 Whiting Award

Works

Short stories

Plays
 Nine Come, Trinity Repertory Company, Providence, RI (1998).

Radio plays
 "Possessed by a Demon: Two Tales of the Devil," was produced for public radio and also presented at the New York Shakespeare Festival/Public Theater as part of the New Works project.

Anthologies

References

External links
"In Dialogue: Elana Greenfield / There Are No Words For Certain Things", The Brooklyn Rail, Jason Grote, July/August 2005
"A REVIEW OF At the Damascus Gate, The Believer, Christopher Kennedy, September 2004
Profile at The Whiting Foundation
 "No Passport w/ Translation Think Tank"

American dramatists and playwrights
Sarah Lawrence College alumni
Brown University alumni
The New School faculty
New York University faculty
Living people
Year of birth missing (living people)